This is a complete listing of Shorea species as accepted in Plants of the World Online as of July 2019. The subgeneric classification  follows Ashton (2004) and covers only species native to northern Borneo, with some Sri Lankan species added. The timber groups classified according to the system proposed by Symington in the early 1940s.

Shorea classification

References

 Ashton, P.S. Dipterocarpaceae. In Tree Flora of Sabah and Sarawak, Volume 5, 2004. Soepadmo, E., Saw, L.G. and Chung, R.C.K. eds. Government of Malaysia, Kuala Lumpur, Malaysia. 
 Sorting Shorea names

Shorea